Lawrence Maxwell (born 17 January 1941) is a Barbadian cricketer. He played in sixteen first-class and two List A matches for the Barbados cricket team from 1968 to 1979.

See also
 List of Barbadian representative cricketers

References

External links
 

1941 births
Living people
Barbadian cricketers
Barbados cricketers
People from Saint Philip, Barbados